Telesto may refer to:
 Telesto (mythology), a figure in Greek mythology
 Telesto (moon), moon of Saturn
 Telesto (coral), genus of Octocorallia